1997–98 Országos Bajnokság I (men's water polo) was the 92nd water polo championship in Hungary.

First stage 

Pld - Played; W - Won; L - Lost; PF - Points for; PA - Points against; Diff - Difference; Pts - Points.

Championship Playoff

Sources 
Gyarmati Dezső: Aranykor (Hérodotosz Könyvkiadó és Értékesítő Bt., Budapest, 2002.)

Seasons in Hungarian water polo competitions
Hungary
1997 in water polo
1997 in Hungarian sport
1998 in water polo
1998 in Hungarian sport